Probate research deals with finding heirs and proving their right to an inheritance. In some estates there may be no known heirs, or there may be missing heirs whose names are known but their contact information is not. There also may be known heirs from one part of the family, but another part of the family may be unknown. In all these instances, professional probate researchers work to trace the next-of-kin.

Probate researchers are also called heir hunters, heir searchers, and forensic genealogists.

Intestacy laws vary enormously from one country to another, and in the US, they also vary from state to state. Thus probate researchers must have extensive knowledge of the law to know which family members are legally entitled to inherit. They also employ specialized genealogical and investigative techniques to search public records and databases to identify the extended family of the deceased, often starting with no more than a name and date of death and in some cases looking for relatives as distant as second cousins. In many cases the heirs that are finally identified have little or no knowledge of the person from whom they are inheriting.

Probate researchers are hired by solicitors in the United Kingdom, or Estate Attorneys in the United States. It is also common for them to independently source estates classed as bona vacantia whereby research is undertaken at their own risk and expense with fees recovered via a commission-based agreement.

Popular culture
The BBC has made twelve series (260 programmes) of Heir Hunters, shown on UK BBC TV about a number of UK companies. Episodes have also been screened in South Africa, Australia and New Zealand.

The future of probate research
As the population lives longer due to improved health, and is more mobile the problem of tracing missing heirs potentially becomes more difficult despite the growth of more web based research tools.

Many people are still reluctant to draft a proper will, or make bad ones which later prove invalid, or can easily be contested. As a consequence millions pass to the state, after a qualify period in trust waiting for claims from entitled beneficiaries, or being found by probate researchers or Heir Hunters.

References

External links
 Law Society UK - find a solicitor

Inheritance
Wills and trusts